The U.S. House Homeland Security Subcommittee on Oversight, Management and Accountability is a standing subcommittee within the House Homeland Security Committee.

The duties of the former Homeland Security Subcommittee on Investigations were combined with this subcommittee starting with the 110th Congress.

Members, 117th Congress

Historical membership rosters

115th Congress

116th Congress

External links
 Official Site

Homeland Oversight